Pharmacy and Therapeutics (P&T) is a peer-reviewed journal of hospital formulary management. Established in 1990 by CORE Medical Journals, it has been published monthly since 2008 by MediMedia. All issues since 2008 are freely available electronically on PubMed Central after a one-month embargo. It continues in series from Hospital Therapy (1985-1990) and the earlier Drug Therapy (1976-1984).

External links

Pharmacology journals
Publications established in 1990
Monthly journals
English-language journals